An Byeong-seok (4 March 1923 – 1984) was a South Korean basketball player. He competed in the men's tournament at the 1948 Summer Olympics and the 1956 Summer Olympics.

References

External links
 

1923 births
1984 deaths
South Korean men's basketball players
Olympic basketball players of South Korea
Basketball players at the 1948 Summer Olympics
Basketball players at the 1956 Summer Olympics
Place of birth missing